Leroy Reid (born 3 August 1963) is a Jamaican sprinter. He competed in the men's 200 metres at the 1984 Summer Olympics.

International competitions

References

1963 births
Living people
Athletes (track and field) at the 1984 Summer Olympics
Jamaican male sprinters
Olympic athletes of Jamaica
Place of birth missing (living people)
Central American and Caribbean Games medalists in athletics